Al-Ahed News is a news website based in Beirut, Lebanon. Al-Ahed (in Arabic language العهد) is owned by Hezbollah. It is available in Arabic, English, French, and Spanish languages.

See also 
 Hezbollah
 Al-Manar
 Al-Nour

References

External links 
 

Hezbollah propaganda organizations
Lebanese news websites
Middle Eastern news websites
Arabic-language websites
English-language websites